Ryan David Pontbriand (born October 1, 1979) is a former American football long snapper and center. He played college football at Rice University and was drafted in the fifth round of the 2003 NFL Draft by the Cleveland Browns. He has the distinction of being the highest-drafted pure long snapper in the history of the NFL Draft.

Early years
Pontbriand attended Clements High School in Sugar Land, Texas, where he was a three-year letterman and a full-time starter on the football team's offensive line. He was a first-team all-district selection as a senior after receiving an honorable mention as a junior. Pontbriand was named his team's offensive lineman of the year during his senior year and was his team's co-captain.

College career
Ryan graduated high school and attended Rice University, redshirting his first year of eligibility in 1998. While at Rice, Pontbriand was the team's long snapper, and graduated with a degree in mechanical engineering.

Professional career

Cleveland Browns
After finishing his fifth year at Rice, Pontbriand was eligible for the NFL Draft. In the fifth round of the 2003 NFL Draft, Ryan was selected by the Cleveland Browns with the 142nd overall pick. Pontbriand is one of only thirteen long snappers drafted since 1982. Pontbriand missed only five games with the Browns, which occurred during the 2005 season due to a back injury. Pontbriand was named to the Pro Bowl as the "need" player in 2007, 2008.

On November 29, 2011, he was released by the Browns due to an injury that was believed to be career-ending.

San Francisco 49ers
Pontbriand signed with the San Francisco 49ers on February 21, 2012. He was brought in to provide competition to Brian Jennings at the position. He was released on June 15, 2012.

References

1979 births
Living people
American Conference Pro Bowl players
American football centers
American football long snappers
Cleveland Browns players
Players of American football from Houston
Rice Owls football players
San Francisco 49ers players